Keith Allan (born July 1, 1969) is an American actor and screenwriter. Projects he has worked on include Social Nightmare and Z Nation.

Filmography

Acting

Writing

References

External links

Living people
American male screenwriters
American male television actors
21st-century American male actors
Place of birth missing (living people)
1969 births